Robson Chisango (born 27 May 1975) is a retired Zimbabwean football striker. A Zimbabwe international, he played at the 2000 COSAFA Cup.

References 

1975 births
Living people
Zimbabwean footballers
Zimbabwe international footballers
Association football forwards
Zimbabwean expatriate footballers
Expatriate soccer players in South Africa
Zimbabwean expatriate sportspeople in South Africa
Expatriate footballers in Botswana
Zimbabwean expatriate sportspeople in Botswana
Black Rhinos F.C. players
Hellenic F.C. players
Gilport Lions F.C. players